Ultimate Collectors' Edition is a compilation box set by the band U.K., released on 4 November 2016. The set includes 14 CDs, 4 Blu-rays and a 66-page book detailing the band's history. The CDs include: remastered versions of the band's two studio albums (U.K. and Danger Money), each with an extra disc containing songs in pre-production form; an extended, 2-CD version of the Night After Night live album featuring a complete show, and a remaster of the original version; a remixed version of Reunion – Live in Tokyo, three concerts from 1978 (In Boston, Philadelphia and Cleveland), two bonus discs with interviews with John Wetton and Eddie Jobson, and the band's final concert from 1979 (In the Netherlands).

The four Blu-ray discs present the albums U.K., Danger Money, the extended Night After Night and Reunion.

Contents
All the songs on each of the albums included are written by Eddie Jobson and John Wetton, except where noted.

CDs

U.K. (2016 remaster)

U.K. Extras

 The band recording the tracks for the "U.K." album. Pre-vocal; guide keyboards; first solos; pre-overdubs; pre-mix.

Live in Boston

 Recorded live at The Paradise Theater, Boston, 11 July 1978. This concert had previously been released in 1999 as "Concert Classics, Vol. 4" without the approval of the band.

Live in Philadelphia

 Recorded live at The Penn's Landing, Philadelphia, 8 August 1978.

Live in Cleveland

 Recorded live at The Agora Ballroom, Cleveland, 18 September 1978.

Danger Money (2016 remaster)

Danger Money Extras

 "When Will You Realize?" was the single B-side of "Night After Night".

Night After Night (extended version)

 Remixed from the original multitrack master tapes.

Night After Night (original version)

Reunion (2016 remix)

Interviews

1979 Final Concert

 Recorded live at Concertgebouw de Vereeniging, Nijmegen, 17 December 1979.

Blu-rays

U.K.

 High fidelity 24-bit/96k.

Danger Money

 High fidelity 24-bit/96k.

Night After Night (extended version)

 High fidelity 24-bit/96k. 2.0 Stereo and 5.1 Surround.

Reunion

 High fidelity 24-bit/96k. Remixed from digital multitrack. Stereo. The Blu-ray does not contain the video of the performance.

Personnel
 Eddie Jobson – keyboards, backing vocals, violin
 John Wetton – bass, lead vocals
 Allan Holdsworth – guitar (Disc 1-5, Blu-ray 1)
 Bill Bruford – drums, percussion (Disc 1-5, Blu-ray 1)
 Terry Bozzio – drums, percussion (Disc 6-9, 12, Blu-ray 2-3)
 Alex Machacek – guitar (Disc 10, Blu-ray 4)
 Marco Minnemann – drums, percussion (Disc 10, Blu-ray 4)

References

2016 compilation albums
U.K. (band) albums
Reissue albums